Ally Hamis Ng'anzi (born 3 September 2000) is a Tanzanian footballer who plays as a midfielder for Loudoun United in the USL Championship.

Club career

Youth and early career
Ng'anzi was a member of the youth team Alliance Academy SC until December 2017, when he moved to Singida United in the Tanzanian Premier League.

Vyškov
In 2018, he moved to Czech third-division club Vyškov. Ng'anzi made his debut for Vyškov in Moravian–Silesian Football League on 10 November 2018, coming on as a substitute for the final 17 minutes of the match against Valašské Meziříčí, which finished as a 4–1 home win.

Move to the United States
On 4 March 2019, Ng'anzi joined Major League Soccer club Minnesota United FC on loan from Vyškov with an option to purchase. He was then immediately sub-loaned to Minnesota's affiliate Forward Madison FC for the club's inaugural season. Minnesota United declined his option at the end of the season.

On 24 January 2020, Ng'anzi signed with USL Championship side Loudoun United.

International career
Ng'anzi was included in Tanzania's under-17 squad during 2017 Africa U-17 Cup of Nations qualification, helping the team qualify for the Africa U-17 Cup of Nations for first time. He was included in Tanzania's squad for the final tournament in Gabon. He appeared in all three of Tanzania's matches, with the team eliminated in the group stage of the tournament.

In 2018, Ng'anzi appeared for the under-20 team, making three appearances in 2019 Africa U-20 Cup of Nations qualification matches. He has also been called up to the under-23 national team.

Personal life
Ng'anzi was born in the Tanzanian city of Mwanza, though he grew up in Dar es Salaam.

Notes

References

External links
 
 
 
 USL profile

2000 births
Living people
People from Mwanza Region
Tanzanian footballers
Tanzanian expatriate footballers
Tanzanian expatriate sportspeople in the United States
Expatriate soccer players in the United States
Association football midfielders
Singida United F.C. players
Minnesota United FC players
Forward Madison FC players
Loudoun United FC players
USL League One players
Expatriate footballers in the Czech Republic
Tanzania youth international footballers
Tanzania under-20 international footballers
USL Championship players
Tanzanian Premier League players
Tanzanian expatriate sportspeople in the Czech Republic